Iowa is a state of the United States of America.

Iowa may also refer to:

People
Iowa people, a Native American Siouan people
Iowa Tribe of Kansas and Nebraska, a federally recognized Indian tribe
Iowa Tribe of Oklahoma, a federally recognized Indian tribe

Places in the United States
Iowa River, a tributary of the Mississippi River
Iowa, Louisiana, a town
Iowa City, Iowa
Iowa Colony, Texas
Iowa County, Iowa
Iowa County, Wisconsin
Iowa Township (disambiguation)

Buildings
Iowa Building, listed on the National Register of Historic Places in Linn County, Iowa
Hotel Iowa, listed on the National Register of Historic Places in Lee County, Iowa

Schools
University of Iowa

Music
 IOWA (music group), a musical trio from Mogilyov
 Iowa (album), a 2001 album by Slipknot
 "Iowa", the last song from the album
 "Iowa", a traditional song from the 1966 album Sixteen Tons of Bluegrass  by Pete Stanley and Wizz Jones
 "Iowa", a song from the 1995 Tangerine Dream album The Dream Mixes
 "Iowa (Travelling III)", a song from the 2001 Dar Williams album Mortal City
 "Iowa", a song from the 1999 John Linnell album State Songs

Ships
, various US Navy ships

SS Iowa, built 1902 as livestock transport, WW I troop ship, sunk as additional breakwater ship Normandy July 1944
, a steamship which sank in 1936, killing 34 crew and passengers
Iowa (steamboat), a steamboat built in 1838; also later ships bearing the same name

Other uses
Episcopal Diocese of Iowa
IOWA, a 2005 independent neo-noir film

See also

Aiwa